Pierre Aubert (3 March 1927 – 8 June 2016) was a Swiss politician, lawyer and member of the Swiss Federal Council (1978–1987).

Political career
He was elected to the Swiss Federal Council on 7 December 1977 as member of the Social Democratic Party from the canton of Neuchâtel. He handed over office on 31 December 1987. After earning a law degree, he became an attorney-at-law in 1953. He began his political career as a member of the City Parliament of La Chaux-de-Fonds (1960–68), then served the Cantonal Parliament of Neuchâtel (1961–75) and was the President of the latter legislative body from  1969 until 70. Elected to the Council of States he sat in this chamber of the Federal Parliament until his election to the Federal Council in 1977. From 1974 to 1977, he belonged to the Parliamentary Assembly of the Council of Europe and was rapporteur for the admission of Portugal. He was the chancellor of the University of Neuchâtel from 1971 to 1977.

During his time in office, Aubert held the  portfolio of the Political Department in 1978 and from 1979 to 1987 after it was renamed to "Federal Department of Foreign Affairs". He was President of the Confederation twice: in 1983 and in 1987. He stood for a Swiss active policy in general and in the Human rights field in particular. Aubert made 55 foreign trips, 39 of which were official trips. Aubert visited four African countries and signed a declaration against apartheid in Nigeria in 1979. He was the first Swiss foreign minister to establish contacts with the PLO leadership when he received Faruk Kaddhumi in July 1980 in Bern. He led the unsuccessful campaign to join the United Nations in 1986 (only 24% of the voters were in favour).

References

External links

1927 births
2016 deaths
People from La Chaux-de-Fonds
Members of the Federal Council (Switzerland)
Foreign ministers of Switzerland
Social Democratic Party of Switzerland politicians
Swiss Protestants
Knights Grand Cross with Collar of the Order of Merit of the Italian Republic
Grand Croix of the Légion d'honneur
Commanders with Star of the Order of Merit of the Republic of Poland